The 2000 Ukrainian Cup Final was a football match that took place at the NSC Olimpiyskiy on 27 May 2000. The match was the 9th Ukrainian Cup Final and it was contested by Dynamo Kyiv and Kryvbas Kryvyi Rih. The 2000 Ukrainian Cup Final was the ninth to be held in the Ukrainian capital Kyiv. Dynamo won by one goal.

Match details

References

External links 
 Calendar of Matches – Schedule of the 1999-00 Ukrainian Cup on the Ukrainian Soccer History web-site (ukrsoccerhistory.com). 
 Game report. Footpass (FFU)

Cup Final
Ukrainian Cup finals
Ukrainian Cup Final 2000
Ukrainian Cup Final 2000
Ukrainian Cup Final 2000